Lu Mountain West Sea, also named Zhelin Reservoir (Gan: Chā-līm fîkhú), is a reservoir located between the counties of Yongxiu, Wuning, and Xiushui in Jiujiang, China. It is 90 kilometers to the south of Lu Mountain, with a total area of 308 square kilometers. The reservoir is the largest in Jiangxi province, with a storage capacity of 7,920,000,000 cubic metres.

Although the dam is located in an area of low seismic activity, after the impounding of the Zhelin Reservoir, seismic activity increased markedly.

Zhelin Reservoir is named after Zhelin Town, the site of the largest hydropower earth dam blocking project in Asia. It has an average water depth of 45 meters and a visibility of more than 9 meters, rich in wild fish species, like Culter alburnus, Red-tailed Xenocypris, Xenocypris davidi, and Siniperca chuatsi.

The American reality program Survivor filmed its fifteenth season, Survivor: China, on islands in the reservoir between June and August 2007. Survivor host Jeff Probst claimed that this was the first American television series to be filmed entirely within China.

References

Bodies of water of Jiangxi
Reservoirs in China
Jiujiang